Diane Passage is an American woman from New York City who has been described as a "socialite".  Her former husband met her when she worked as an exotic dancer at Scores, one of the New York City strip clubs profiled in the movie Hustlers.

Passage was born in Detroit, and moved to New York when she was 17 years old.  Exotic dancing was just one of her jobs.  At the time she met her second husband Kenneth I. Starr, a Wall Street hedge fund manager, her day job was at an ad agency.  Passage quit dancing after marrying Starr, in 2007, and three years later Starr's investors learned he had been running a ponzi scheme.  

When her judge pronounced her husband's guilty verdict she proclaimed that “He seemed to have lost his moral compass, partly as a result of infatuation with his young fourth wife.”

After she separated from Starr, Passage was cast in a reality TV show that would have been called Wall Street Wives.  The series did not end up being produced.

Wesley Snipes, a movie star who faced serious penalties for a tax evasion conviction, contacted Passage, seeking help getting his conviction overturned.  Snipes had been one of her ex-husband's clients, and Starr had testified against him, and Snipes was concerned that the jury had not been informed that Starr had himself been under investigation when he testified against him.
Passage described feeling worried for her safety, thinking shadowy men were following her, but they turned out to be private investigators working for Snipes.

After her husband's arrest she says she befriended her neighbor, Catherine Hopper, the fiancee of the son of another ponzi schemer, Bernie Madoff.

In 2011 Passage started writing a dating advice column that Gawker mocked for its cynicism.

In 2012 Passage announced she would be writing a tell-all book about her ex-husband.

Passage is a proponent of pole dancing. She has organized charity events focussed around pole dancing and worked to get it recognized as a sport, even suggesting it had a place at the Olympic Games.

See also
 Samantha Barbash
 Roselyn Keo

References

American erotic dancers
1976 births
Living people